{{DISPLAYTITLE:C28H42O3}}
The molecular formula C28H42O3 (molar mass: 426.641 g/mol, exact mass: 426.3134 u) may refer to:

 Estradiol decanoate (E2D)
 Testosterone cyclohexylpropionate